The Shell House massacre was a 1994 shooting incident that took place at Shell House, the headquarters of the African National Congress (ANC), in central Johannesburg, South Africa in the lead up to the 1994 elections.

Description
Shell House (not to be confused with Luthuli House, where the ANC later relocated) at 51 Plein Street, Johannesburg, South Africa was the headquarters of the ANC after the organisation was unbanned until 1997. On 28 March 1994, about 20,000 Inkatha Freedom Party (IFP) supporters marched to Shell House in protest against the 1994 elections that the IFP was intending to boycott.

The ANC people opened fire, killing nineteen people. At the time, guards claimed that the IFP supporters were storming the building or that a tip-off had been received of that being planned.

The Nugent Commission of Inquiry into the killings rejected that explanation. The commission's conclusion was that the shooting by ANC guards was unjustified.

The incident reflected the rising tensions between the ANC and IFP, which had begun in the 1980s in KwaZulu-Natal and had then spread to other provinces in the 1990s. The IFP claimed that the ANC was intent on undermining traditional authorities and the power of Zulu chiefs; the ANC saw a power struggle as the demise of apartheid was finalised.

Aftermath

The incident triggered a state of emergency across eleven magisterial districts in the East Rand, as well as the whole of the KwaZulu and Natal province.

In June 1995, ANC and then President Nelson Mandela claimed that he had given the order to defend Shell House, even if it should require killing people. In 1995 Willem Ratte laid a complaint of murder against president Nelson Mandela at the police headquarters in Pretoria for the Shell House massacre.

The Truth and Reconciliation Commission granted amnesty to 11 people concerning the massacre.

See also
List of massacres in South Africa

References

External links
AfricaFiles homepage 
Dispatch Online
Human Rights Watch 
Sunday Times - Print Edition

Conflicts in 1994
Massacres in 1994
Events associated with apartheid
1994 in South Africa
History of the African National Congress
Inkatha Freedom Party
History of Johannesburg
Protests in South Africa
1990s in Johannesburg
March 1994 events in Africa
1994 murders in South Africa
1990s massacres in South Africa